Marc Gallego (born 13 August 1985) is a German footballer of Spanish descent who currently plays for Sportfreunde Dorfmerkingen.

References

External links
 
 Marc Gallego at FuPa

1985 births
Living people
German footballers
German people of Spanish descent
Karlsruher SC II players
Sportfreunde Siegen players
FSV Frankfurt players
SV Elversberg players
SV Waldhof Mannheim players
FC 08 Homburg players
2. Bundesliga players
Footballers from Karlsruhe
3. Liga players
Regionalliga players
Association football defenders
Association football midfielders
21st-century German people